Eucyclotoma exilis is a species of sea snail, a marine gastropod mollusk in the family Raphitomidae.

Description
The length of the shell attains 12 mm.

The white shell is finely decussated by raised striae. The body whorl shows three keels, the upper ones are one-keeled.

Distribution
This marine species occurs off the Philippines, Samoa and Queensland, Australia

References

 Reeve, L.A. 1843. Monograph of the genus Pleurotoma. pls 1–18 in Reeve, L.A. (ed.). Conchologica Iconica. London : L. Reeve & Co. Vol. 1.
 Dunker, G. 1871. Mollusca nova Musei Godeffroy Hamburgensis. Malakozoologische Blätter 18: 150–175 
 Adams, H. 1872. Descriptions of fourteen new species of land and marine shells. Proceedings of the Zoological Society of London 1872: 12-15; pl. 13
 Powell, A.W.B. 1966. The molluscan families Speightiidae and Turridae, an evaluation of the valid taxa, both Recent and fossil, with list of characteristic species. Bulletin of the Auckland Institute and Museum. Auckland, New Zealand 5: 1–184, pls 1–23 [

External links
 
  Hedley, C. 1922. A revision of the Australian Turridae. Records of the Australian Museum 13(6): 213-359, pls 42-56 
 OBIS: Eucyclotoma exilis

exilis
Gastropods described in 1871